Jet Novuka (born 3 March 1971) is a South African actor also known as Sir Jet Novuka.

Early life
Novuka was born and raised in Mthatha's Ngangelizwe township on 3 March 1971, the same township South African DJ Black Coffee grew up at. A pupil that only went to school for acting, he graduated at Fuba School of Drama & Visual Arts and also received training at Funda Arts Centre. It was in 1990 where his acting career began where he was a cast in the 1990 film, "The King's Mesenger"..Novuka is also one of the best leading producers in Southern Africa.

Television
He is notable for portraying roles in SA tv series; Home Affairs, Igazi, Mfolozi Street, Isidingo: The Need, Jacob's Cross & Letters of Hope.

His other TV casts include; 4Play: Sex Tips for Girls, Ingozi, Montana, MTV Shuga, Ngempela, Nkululeko, Soul Buddyz, The River as Walter , Tsha Tsha, Usindiso, Yizo Yizo, Zero Tolerance & Zone 14 and his recent appearance in uZalo

Awards
He won the Rapid Lion 2020 - Best Actor in a Supporting Role for his role in Letters of Hope award.

Notes

External links

1969 births
Living people
People from Mthatha
Xhosa people
South African male actors